Boško Jovović (born 10 October 1983) is a Serbian professional basketball player who last played for Union Sportive Maubeugeoise of the France NM2.

References

External links
 Bosko Jovovic at proballers.com
 Boško Jovovic at eurobasket.com
 Bosko Jovovic at realgm.com
 Bosko Jovovic at balkanleague.net

1983 births
Living people
Basketball players from Belgrade
KK Crnokosa players
KK Smederevo players
KK Napredak Kruševac players
BC Balkan Botevgrad players
Basketball League of Serbia players
Serbian expatriate basketball people in Bulgaria
Serbian expatriate basketball people in France
Serbian expatriate basketball people in Greece
Serbian expatriate basketball people in Morocco
Serbian expatriate basketball people in North Macedonia
Serbian men's basketball players
Power forwards (basketball)